Colin Henry Williams (born 12 August 1952) is a British Anglican priest. Since 2015, he has served as an Archdeacon in the Diocese in Europe; he was Archdeacon of Lancaster from 1999 to 2005.

Early life and education
Williams was born on 12 August 1952, the son of William Henry Williams and Blanche Williams. He was educated at King George V Grammar School for Boys, Southport, and Pembroke College, Oxford, whence he graduated Bachelor of Arts (BA) 1973 and proceeded Master of Arts (Oxford) (MA Oxon) 1977. He trained at the College of Law, Chester, qualified and practised as a solicitor in Wigan, 1974–1978.

Ordained ministry
Williams trained for the ministry at St Stephen's House, Oxford, 1980–1981, gaining a second BA. He was made a deacon at Petertide 1981 (12 July) and ordained a priest the Petertide following (4 July 1982) – both times by David Sheppard, Bishop of Liverpool, at Liverpool Cathedral. After a curacy at St Paul's Stoneycroft, Liverpool, he was Team Vicar in Walton from 1984 to 1989. He served as domestic chaplain to the Bishop of Blackburn (Alan Chesters) – and Chaplain (lead clergy) of Whalley Abbey retreat and conference centre – from 1989 to 1994. Whilst Vicar of St Chad's Poulton-le-Fylde from 1994 to 1999, he was also elected a Proctor in Convocation, serving two quinquennia (1995–2005), and became a member of the Meissen Commission (1996–2005).

In 1999, he was collated Archdeacon of Lancaster (in the Diocese of Blackburn), which post he held (he was afterwards made "archdeacon emeritus") until his 2005 appointment as General Secretary of the ecumenical Conference of European Churches, based in Geneva. While Archdeacon, he was a member of the Council for Christian Unity, 2003–2005; he was later made an honorary canon of Cathedral of the Holy Trinity, Gibraltar, 2007–2010. He returned to parish ministry in 2010, becoming Team Rector of the Ludlow Team Ministry; during which time he was made an honorary canon and prebendary of Hereford Cathedral from 2014 onwards.

On 24 May 2015, it was announced that Williams would become Archdeacon of Europe – i.e. the first full-time Archdeacon in the Diocese in Europe from October 2015. Historically, archdeacons in Europe have had other parochial (chaplaincy) duties in addition to their work as archdeacons. He was in charge of both the Eastern archdeaconry and that of Germany and Northern Europe, and he was based in Frankfurt, Germany.

In 2018, it was announced that Williams is to retire effective 31 March 2019.

References

English solicitors
Archdeacons of Lancaster
Archdeacons of Europe
Archdeacons of the Eastern Archdeaconry
Archdeacons of Germany and Northern Europe
1952 births

Living people

People educated at King George V College
Alumni of Pembroke College, Oxford